The 1964 NCAA University Division baseball tournament was played at the end of the 1964 NCAA University Division baseball season to determine the national champion of college baseball.  The tournament concluded with eight teams competing in the College World Series, a double-elimination tournament in its eighteenth year.  Eight regional districts sent representatives to the College World Series with preliminary rounds within each district serving to determine each representative.  These events would later become known as regionals.  Each district had its own format for selecting teams, resulting in 21 teams participating in the tournament at the conclusion of their regular season, and in some cases, after a conference tournament.  The College World Series was held in Omaha, NE from June 8 to June 18.  The eighteenth tournament's champion was Minnesota, coached by Dick Siebert.  The Most Outstanding Player was Joe Ferris of third place Maine.

Regionals
The opening rounds of the tournament were played across seven district sites across the country, each consisting of a field of two to four teams. Each district tournament, except District 2 and District 5, was double-elimination. The winners of each district advanced to the College World Series.

Bold indicates winner.  * indicates extra innings.

District 1 at Boston, MA

District 2 at Princeton, NJ

District 3 at Gastonia, NC

District 4 at Kent, OH

District 5 at Columbia, MO

District 6
Texas A&M automatically qualified for the College World Series out of District 6.

District 7 at Colorado Springs, CO

^ Note: Colorado State College of Education became Northern Colorado University in 1970.

District 8 at Los Angeles, CA

College World Series

Participants

Results

Bracket

Game results

All-Tournament Team
The following players were members of the All-Tournament Team.

Notable players
 Arizona State: Sal Bando, Fred Rico, Al Schmelz
 Maine:
 Minnesota: Frank Brosseau, Bill Davis
 Ole Miss: Don Kessinger
 Missouri: Dennis Musgraves, John Sevcik
 Seton Hall: Bill Henry
 Southern California: Ray Lamb, Gary Sutherland
 Texas A&M:

References

NCAA Division I Baseball Championship
Tournament